The 2022/23 FIS Cross-Country World Cup, organized by the International Ski Federation is the 42nd World Cup in cross-country skiing for men and women. The season started on 25 November 2022 in Ruka, Finland and will conclude on 26 March 2023 in Lahti, Finland.

The season features a break in February and March for the World Championships in Planica.

Johannes Høsflot Klæbo from Norway and Natalya Nepryayeva from Russia are the defending overall champions from the 2021–22 season. Nepryayeva won’t defend her title because of the decision of the FIS Council, that Russia and Belarus have been suspended for this World Cup season due to the Russian invasion of Ukraine.

Map of world cup hosts 
All 15 locations hosting world cup events in this season.

Men

Calendar

Men's relay

Standings

Overall

Distance

Sprint

U23

Bonus Ranking

Prize money

Women

Calendar

Women's relay

Standings

Overall

Distance

Sprint

U23

Bonus Ranking

Prize money

Mixed team

Nations Cup

Overall

Men

Women

Podium table by nation 
Table showing the World Cup podium places (gold–1st place, silver–2nd place, bronze–3rd place) by the countries represented by the athletes.

Points distribution 
The table shows the number of points to win in every competition in the 2022/23 Cross-Country Skiing World Cup for men and women.

Achievements 

Only individual events.

First World Cup career victory 

Men
 Iver Tildheim Andersen (22), in his 2nd season – the WC 4 (10 km F) in Lillehammer – 1st place; also first podium
 Harald Østberg Amundsen (24), in his 5th season – the WC 13 (10 km F) in Les Rousses – 1st place; first podium was 2021–22 WC 15 (15 km F) in Falun

Women
 Emma Ribom (24), in her 5th season – the WC 1 (Sprint C) in Ruka; first podium was 2020–21 WC 5 (Sprint C) in Val di Fiemme
 Tiril Udnes Weng (26), in her 9th season – the WC 11 (10 km Pursuit C) in Val Müstair; first podium was 2021–22 WC 4 (Sprint F) in Lillehammer
 Lotta Udnes Weng (26), in her 9th season – the WC 11 (Sprint C) in Val di Fiemme; first podium was 2022–23 WC 7 (Sprint C) in Beitostølen
 Katharina Hennig (26), in her 8th season – the WC 11 (15 km Mass Start C) in Val di Fiemme; first podium was 2019–20 WC 6 (10 km Mass Start C) in Val di Fiemme
 Delphine Claudel (26), in her 7th season – the WC 11 (10 km Mass Start F) in Val di Fiemme; first podium was 2020–21 WC 5 (10 km Mass Start F) in Val di Fiemme
 Kristine Stavås Skistad (23), in her 6th season – the WC 14 (Sprint C) in Les Rousses; also first podium

First World Cup podium 

Men
 Iver Tildheim Andersen (22), in his 2nd season – the WC 4 (10 km F) in Lillehammer – 1st place
 Even Northug (27), in his 8th season – the WC 1 (Sprint C) in Ruka – 2nd place
 Simone Mocellini (24), in his 2nd season – the WC 7 (Sprint C) in Beitostølen – 2nd place
 Jules Lapierre (27), in his 5th season – the WC 11 (10 km Mass Start F) in Val di Fiemme – 3rd place
   Janik Riebli (24), in his 5th season – the WC 12 (Sprint F) in Livigno – 3rd place

Women
 Lotta Udnes Weng (26), in her 9th season – the WC 7 (Sprint C) in Beitostølen – 2nd place
 Anne Kjersti Kalvå (30), in her 10th season – the WC 8 (10 km C) in Beitostølen – 2nd place
 Sophia Laukli (22), in her 3rd season – the WC 11 (10 km Mass Start F) in Val di Fiemme – 3rd place
 Kristine Stavås Skistad (23), in her 6th season – the WC 14 (Sprint C) in Les Rousses – 1st place
 Astrid Øyre Slind (34), in her 8th season – the WC 15 (20 km Mass Start C) in Les Rousses – 3rd place

Number of wins this season (in brackets are all-time wins) 

Men
 Johannes Høsflot Klæbo – 17 (65)
 Pål Golberg – 3 (10)
 Simen Hegstad Krüger – 3 (9)
 Richard Jouve – 2 (4)
 Federico Pellegrino – 1 (17)
 Harald Østberg Amundsen – 1 (1)
 Iver Tildheim Andersen – 1 (1)

Women
 Frida Karlsson – 5 (8)
 Ebba Andersson – 4 (5)
   Nadine Fähndrich – 3 (4)
 Kristine Stavås Skistad – 3 (3)
 Jessie Diggins – 2 (14)
 Jonna Sundling – 2 (7)
 Kerttu Niskanen – 2 (5)
 Emma Ribom – 2 (2)
 Ragnhild Gløersen Haga – 1 (2)
 Delphine Claudel – 1 (1)
 Katharina Hennig – 1 (1)
 Lotta Udnes Weng – 1 (1)
 Tiril Udnes Weng – 1 (1)

Retirements

Men

Women
 Anna Dyvik

Notes

References 

2022–23 FIS Cross-Country World Cup
FIS Cross-Country World Cup seasons
World Cup
World Cup
Cross-country